Trematocranus microstoma, known in the aquarium trade as the "Haplochromis placodon pointed head" is a species of cichlid endemic to Lake Malawi where it is found in shallow waters close to shore, apparently showing a preference for areas with plentiful vegetation.  This species can reach a length of  TL.  This species can also be found in the aquarium trade.

References

microstoma
Taxa named by Ethelwynn Trewavas
Fish described in 1935
Taxonomy articles created by Polbot